
Gmina Wierzbno is a rural gmina (administrative district) in Węgrów County, Masovian Voivodeship, in east-central Poland. Its seat is the village of Wierzbno, which lies approximately 15 kilometres (9 mi) south-west of Węgrów and 58 km (36 mi) north-east of Warsaw.

Villages
Gmina Wierzbno contains the villages and settlements of Adamów, Brzeźnik, Cierpięta, Czerwonka, Czerwonka-Folwark, Filipy, Helenów, Janówek, Jaworek, Józefy, Karczewiec, Kazimierzów, Koszewnica, Krypy, Las Jaworski, Majdan, Nadzieja, Natolin, Orzechów, Ossówno, Rąbież, Skarżyn, Soboń, Stary Dwór, Strupiechów, Sulki, Świdno, Wąsosze, Wierzbno, Wólka, Wyczółki and Wyględówek.

Neighbouring gminas
Gmina Wierzbno is bordered by the gminas of Dobre, Grębków, Kałuszyn, Korytnica and Liw.

References

Polish official population figures 2006

Wierzbno
Węgrów County